BTO's Greatest is a U.S. CD-only compilation album by Bachman–Turner Overdrive. It was released in 1986 by Mercury Records. It was released in Europe also on vinyl.

Track listing
"Looking Out for No.1" (Randy Bachman) - 5:20
"Roll On Down the Highway" (Robbie Bachman, Fred Turner) - 3:55
"Hey You" (Randy Bachman) - 3:34
"Freeways" (Randy Bachman) - 4:56
"Takin' Care of Business" (Randy Bachman) - 4:52
"Down, Down" (Randy Bachman) - 4:20
"You Ain't Seen Nothing Yet" (Randy Bachman) - 3:38
"Let It Ride" (Randy Bachman, Turner) - 4:28
"Flat Broke Love" (Turner) - 3:57
"Can We All Come Together" (Randy Bachman) - 5:50
"Rock and Roll Nights" (Jim Clench) - 5:19
"Jamaica" (Jim Vallance) - 4:09

References
[ BTO's Greatest] at Allmusic
BTO's Greatest at Discogs.com

Bachman–Turner Overdrive compilation albums
1981 greatest hits albums
Mercury Records compilation albums